Ascochyta graminea is a plant pathogen that causes Ascochyta leaf spot on barley which can also be caused by the related fungi Ascochyta hordei, Ascochyta sorghi and Ascochyta tritici. It is considered a minor disease of barley.

See also
List of Ascochyta species

References

External links

Fungal plant pathogens and diseases
Barley diseases
graminea
Fungi described in 1950